The 1952 Tangerine Bowl was an American college football bowl game played after the 1951 season, on January 1, 1952, at the Tangerine Bowl stadium in Orlando, Florida. The Stetson Hatters with a record of 7–1–2 played the Arkansas State Indians (now the Arkansas State Red Wolves) with a record of 10–1. Stetson won by a score of 35–20.

Game summary
The first quarter of the game saw only one score; a 5-yard rush for an Arkansas State touchdown. The quarter ended 7–0, Indians.

The second quarter featured minimal scoring as well; Stetson tied the game after a 2–yard pass to make it 7–7, though the Indians quickly recovered and scored their second touchdown to give them back the lead. The extra point was missed, however, and the game went to halftime 13–7 with Arkansas State in the lead.

Stetson's offense took off in the third quarter, finding the end zone on three occasions: two passes (23 and 30 yards) and a 5–yard rush. All extra points were converted, and the Hatters took a 28–13 lead into the final quarter after their defense pitched a shutout in the third quarter.

The fourth quarter saw both teams score one final time, both touchdowns, and the game finished 35–20 in favor of Stetson.

This was the Hatters' first bowl victory in their first bowl appearance (and the only appearance to date), making them 1–0 overall in bowl games.

Statistics

References

Tangerine Bowl
Citrus Bowl (game)
Arkansas State Red Wolves football bowl games
Stetson Hatters football bowl games
Tangerine Bowl
Tangerine Bowl